Nadezhda Andreevna Lomova (born 19 January 1991) is a Russian weightlifter. She won a silver medal in the 63 kg division at the 2014 European Weightlifting Championships. In 2019 she tested positive for Metenolone metabolites and is banned by the International Weightlifting Federation until 2027.

References

1991 births
Living people
Russian female weightlifters
European Weightlifting Championships medalists
20th-century Russian women
21st-century Russian women